Horwood is a local service district and designated place in the Canadian province of Newfoundland and Labrador. It was formerly known as Dog Bay. It is located northeast of Lewisporte just off of Route 331. It was once the home of a bustling lumber company owned by the Horwood family. Dog Bay was renamed Horwood after the family name.

Geography 
Horwood is in Newfoundland within Subdivision L of Division No. 8.

Demographics 

Government 
Horwood is a local service district (LSD) that is governed by a committee responsible for the provision of certain services to the community. The chair of the LSD committee is Violet Barnes.

See also 
List of communities in Newfoundland and Labrador
List of designated places in Newfoundland and Labrador
List of local service districts in Newfoundland and Labrador

References 

Populated coastal places in Canada
Designated places in Newfoundland and Labrador
Local service districts in Newfoundland and Labrador